George Kelly Dunlop (November 10, 1830 – March 12, 1888) was missionary bishop for the Episcopal Church's Missionary District of New Mexico and Arizona from 1880 to 1888.

Early life and education
Dunlop was born on November 19, 1830, in County Tyrone, Ireland, son of Robert Dunlop and Margret Kelly, both of whom were of Scottish descent. He studied at the Royal School Dungannon and later at Queen's University of Ireland, from where he graduated in 1852. He arrived in the United States in October 1852. He was awarded a Doctor of Sacred Theology from Racine College in 1880.

Ordained ministry
Dunlop was ordained deacon on December 4, 1854, in Palmyra, Missouri, and later priest on August 7, 1856, in St John's Church in St. Louis, Missouri, both by Bishop Cicero Stephens Hawks of Missouri. He served as missionary deacon in St. Charles, Missouri, between 1854 and 1856. Later he became rector of Christ Church in Lexington, Missouri, and in 1864 rector of Grace Church in Kirkwood, Missouri, till 1880. He also served as dean of the St Louis Convocation of the Diocese of Missouri and deputy to the General Convention of 1871, 1877 and 1880.

Bishop
Dunlop was elected Missionary Bishop of Arizona and New Mexico in 1880 and consecrated on November 21, 1880, by Bishop Henry Benjamin Whipple of Minnesota in Christ Church, St. Louis. He assumed his duties on March 21, 1881. He died in office due to pneumonia on March 12, 1888.

Family
Dunlop married Mary Wickham Cobb on July 23, 1857, and had seven children.

See also 
 Episcopal Diocese of Arizona
 Episcopal Diocese of the Rio Grande

External links 
 
 The Living Church Annual 1886

1830 births
1888 deaths
19th-century American Episcopalians
Episcopal bishops of the Rio Grande
Episcopal bishops of Arizona
19th-century American clergy